Sanio, or more precisely Saniyo-Hiyewe, is a Sepik language of Tunap/Hunstein Rural LLG in East Sepik Province, northern Papua New Guinea. It is also spoken in Telefomin Rural LLG, Sandaun Province.

Dialects
Dialects are:
Hiyowe dialect, spoken in Maposi village of Tunap-Hunstein Rural LLG
Saniyo dialect, spoken in Hanasi, Malapute’e, Pukapuki, Salunapi, and Sio villages of Tunap-Hunstein Rural LLG

References

Sepik Hill languages
Languages of East Sepik Province